Três Irmãs  is a Brazilian telenovela produced and aired by TV Globo, from 15 September 2008 to 10 April 2009 with a total of 179 episodes, replacing Beleza Pura, being replaced by Caras & Bocas.

Plot
The plot is based on Virginia and her daughters, the three sisters: Dora, Alma and Susana, in their respective pursuits for happiness, having as background a fictitious beach, the beautiful Blue Beach.

Dora is the eldest daughter of Virginia. Widow and mother of Marquinho, she lives with her mother-in-law, the villain Violeta Aquila, who blames her for the premature death of her son, Artur Aquila. She's a beautiful, funny, high-spirited woman. With the onset of her mother's illness, she moves to Praia Azul. With the arrival of orthodontist Bento, who has just lost his wife, Teresa, that they will start a beautiful love story, marked mainly by Violeta's interference, who will do anything to destroy the daughter-in-law's happiness. With the beginning of the romance of Bento and Dora, the Violeta will make the grandson against the relationship, and the boy will find in Rafinha, Bento's eldest daughter; they form an alliance to disrupt their parents' romance.

Alma is the middle sister, a beautiful and intelligent woman, but confused and clumsy. She lived in Rio de Janeiro, where she is a doctor. She is very lucky at work, but not in love. With the end of her relationship with Robinho begins Virginia's illness. She will head to Caramirim, where she will find surfer Gregg and the unscrupulous Hercules Galvão, his great loves from the past, who struggled enough to be happy alongside the woman they really say love. Alma will work in the Caramirim outpatient clinic alongside Dr. Alcides, Violeta's husband and his great friend and protector, who in the past helped pay for her medical studies.

Susana is the youngest, and adopted. She's the only one who lives next to her mother. She is a beautiful, natural woman. A Geography teacher at the local school and also an excellent surfer. But the daily life of Susana and the residents of Caramirim will change with the arrival of the other two sisters to the city. However, what will change her life will be the arrival of Walkíria, with whom she will have an overwhelming passion and obstacles.

Cast

References

2008 telenovelas
Brazilian telenovelas
2008 Brazilian television series debuts
2009 Brazilian television series endings
TV Globo telenovelas
Portuguese-language telenovelas
Television series about sisters